Starouzmyashevo (İśke Üźmäş) is a rural locality (a selo) in Chekmagushevsky District, Bashkortostan, Russia. The population was 122 as of 2010. There is 1 street.

Geography 
Starouzmyashevo is located 25 km southwest of Chekmagush (the district's administrative centre) by road. Verkhniye Karyavdy is the nearest rural locality.

References 

Rural localities in Chekmagushevsky District